Kwesi Lee Sinclair (born 26 October 1978) is a Guyanese-born former British Virgin Islands cricketer. Sinclair was a right-handed batsman.

In February 2008, the British Virgin Islands were invited to take part in the 2008 Stanford 20/20, whose matches held official Twenty20 status. Sinclair made a single appearance in the tournament against Dominica in a preliminary round defeat, with Sinclair being dismissed for 9 runs by Liam Sebastien.

References

External links
Kwesi Sinclair at ESPNcricinfo
Kwesi Sinclair at CricketArchive

1978 births
Living people
Guyanese cricketers
British Virgin Islands cricketers
Guyanese emigrants to the British Virgin Islands